The 2011–12 season is Barnet's 124th year in existence. Along with competing in League Two, the club also participated in the FA Cup, EFL Cup and EFL Trophy.

League table

Results

Pre-season friendlies

League Two

FA Cup

League Cup

Football League Trophy 

Swindon Town won 2–1 on aggregate

Herts Senior Cup

Squad statistics

Appearances and goals

Top scorers

Transfers

Players Transferred In

Players Transferred Out

Players Loaned In

Players Loaned Out

References 

2011–12
2011–12 Football League Two by team